Underplayed is a 2020 Canadian documentary film, directed by Stacey Lee. The film profiles various women in electronic music, centring in large part on their struggles to be taken as seriously as male counterparts during the 2019 music festival season due to continued gender inequality in the music business.

Artists profiled in the film include Rezz, Nervo, Nightwave, Sherelle, Tygapaw, Tokimonsta and Alison Wonderland. It also contextualizes the broader history of women in electronic music, including information about pioneers such as Delia Derbyshire, Suzanne Ciani and Daphne Oram.

The film premiered on April 15, 2020, at the Tribeca Film Festival, and had its Canadian premiere at the 2020 Toronto International Film Festival on September 19. Its Toronto screening, at Ontario Place's OLG Play stage, was followed by a DJ set by Rezz.

The film was added to Crave's streaming service in March 2021.

References

External links 
 

2020 films
2020 documentary films
Canadian documentary films
Documentary films about women in music
Documentary films about electronic music and musicians
2020s English-language films
2020s Canadian films